Josiah Conder (17 September 1789 – 27 December 1855), was an abolitionist, author and hymn-writer. A correspondent of Robert Southey and well-connected to Romantic authors of his day, he was editor of the British literary magazine The Eclectic Review, the Nonconformist and abolitionist newspaper The Patriot, the author of romantic verses, poetry, and many popular hymns that survive to this day. His most ambitious non-fiction work was the thirty-volume worldwide geographical tome The Modern Traveller; and his best-selling compilation book The Congregational Hymn Book. Conder was a prominent London Congregationalist, an abolitionist, and took an active part in seeking to repeal British anti-Jewish laws.

Early life
The fourth son of Thomas Conder, an active Nonconformist who worked in the City of London as an engraver and bookseller, Josiah was born on 17 September 1789 at his father's bookshop in Falcon Street. His grandfather was Dr John Conder, a Dissenting minister and President of Homerton College and his uncle was James Conder the coin collector.

In his infancy, Josiah lost the vision in one eye due to smallpox. He was sent a few miles north of the City of London to the village of Hackney, for electrical treatment, a technique believed to be able to prevent the disease from spreading to also cause blindness in his other eye. He recovered, and continued to be educated at a dissenting academy in Hackney village, under the tutorship of the Reverend Mr. Palmer.

At the age of ten his first essay were published in 'The Monthly Preceptor', and on reaching fifteen, he began work as an assistant in his family's City bookshop. On reaching the age of 21 (in 1811), he took over the family business. A short time later, Josiah married Joan Elizabeth Thomas ('Eliza Thomas'), one of his circle of friends with whom he had initially formed a literary association in 1810 to jointly contribute to the book, The Associate Minstrels. She continued to write after her marriage, for example contributing two short narratives 'On the Ausonia Butterfly flying over the Summit of Mont Blanc' and 'The Air Orchis' to The Christian Keepsake in 1837.

Writing
Josiah Conder's work at the bookshop soon came to an end (c.1819), after wider recognition of his literary talents had led to him being offered the editorship of The Eclectic Review, a prestigious literary journal that he continued to edit for twenty years (1814–37). With strong Congregational links, he was also invited to edit The Patriot, a newspaper that espoused nonconformist and evangelical causes, and for which he was editor for twenty-three years (1832–55).

The Choir & The Oratory or Praise & Prayer, became noted for one poem, 'The Apocalypse', which earned him a place in English Romantic literature; its popularity prompted him to pen the commentary, The Harmony of History with Prophecy, and Explanation of the Apocalypse for the more interested of his readers.

Considered to reflect his evangelical and liberal, nondenominational, outlook, these hymns were widely adopted by churches and chapels throughout the western world. By the early twentieth century, some seventy years after his death, one biographer noted that more of Josiah Conder's hymns were in common use in Britain and the USA, than those of any other Congregational author except for the great Dr Isaac Watts and his friend Philip Doddridge.

Political work for abolition

Josiah Conder's political work included a tract on the superior value of free labour over slave labour. In 1839 he became a founding Committee Member of the British and Foreign Anti-Slavery Society, which after a merge with the Aborigines' Protection Society and several changes of name is today known as Anti-Slavery International. In this role he was an organiser of, and delegate to, the world's first Anti-slavery convention, which was held in London in 1840 – an event depicted in a large painting by Benjamin Haydon that hangs in the National Portrait Gallery, London. His poem 'The Last Night of Slavery' dated 1 August 1834, evoking the horrors of the middle passage, was published in his collection, The Choir and the Oratory, or Praise and Prayer, 1837. It was republished in the anthology, Slavery, Abolition and Emancipation: writings in the British Romantic Period (London: Pickering & Chatto) in 1999. Josiah Conder's Biographical Sketch of the Late Thomas Pringle, the Secretary of the Anti-Slavery Society, was published in 1835, and widely sold bound together with Thomas Pringle's own Narrative of a Residence in South Africa (1834).

Shortly before his untimely death, Josiah Conder was prominent in the campaign to finance and make arrangements for Samuel Ringgold Ward, an African-American who escaped slavery in the US, to travel the length and breadth of Britain speaking to crowds to encourage support for the abolition of slavery in southern states of America, at a time when British foreign policy, as epitomised by Viscount Palmerston, was supportive of slavery in the US in marked contrast to its determined attempts to close down the supply and trade from West African chieftains, eventually isolating just the King of Dahomey and the Chief of Lagos. Samuel Ringgold Ward held a large meeting at Crosby Hall on 20 March 1854, to thank Josiah Conder and others in his close circle, mainly nonconformists such as Dr Thomas Binney and the Rev James Sherman who supported him in England in contrast to the double standards of government policy which prioritised cheap cotton from the southern slave states over African-American civil rights.

Joseph Conder's wife also took a role in abolitionism in the United States. In December 1852, along with a number of other British women of the period, she was part of the group of ladies who met at Stafford House on Friday, 26 December to consider the expediency of addressing a memorial from the women of England to the women of the United States, on the subject of slavery, and developed this work through her role on the sub-committee.

Death and memorial
Josiah Conder died on 27 December 1855, at St John's Wood, Hampstead, following an attack of jaundice, and was buried at the Congregationalists' non-denominational garden cemetery, Abney Park Cemetery, Stoke Newington with a grey, polished granite, chest tomb as his monument. His literary wife Joan, died aged 91 in 1877 and is buried with him and other family members.

"He left five children, one of whom is a daughter. The four sons are, Mr. Francis R. Conder, a civil engineer and railway contractor; the Rev. Eustace R. Conder, Pastor of the Congregational Church at Poole; Mr. Josiah Conder of the Bank of England; and Mr Charles Conder, who is associated in professional pursuits with his eldest brother."

Works

The Modern Traveller
Although Josiah Conder never travelled abroad himself, he compiled all thirty volumes of The Modern Traveller, his non-fiction publishing epic covering the geography of many of countries of the world. It sold well, but was outsold by his Congregational Hymn Book, some 90,000 copies of which were ordered in its first seven years.

Other books
The Congregational Hymn Book, 1834
The Withered Oak, 1805
The Reverie, 1811
The Star in the East, with Other Poems Chiefly Religious and Domestic, 1824
 Sacred Poems, Domestic Poems, and Miscellaneous Poems, 1824
 
 The Choir and the Oratory, 1836/7
 Analytical and Comparative View of All Religions Now Extant among Mankind, 1838 (Conder was the first European writer to distinguish between different traditions of non-European religion, in this work.)
 The Harmony of History with Prophecy, an explanation of the Apocalypse, 1849
 Hymns of Praise, Prayer, and Devout Meditation, 1856
 The Poet of the Sanctuary, I. Watts, 1851
 Pilgrim's Progress by John Bunyan, with a Life of the Author by Josiah Conder, 1838
 Narrative of a Residence in South Africa by Thomas Pringle, with a Life of the Author by Josiah Conder, 1835

Hymns

Amongst his hymns the following are well-known:
 Baptised into our Saviour's death
 Be merciful, O God of Grace
 Beyond, beyond that boundless sea
 Blessed be God, He is not strict
 Bread of heaven, on Thee we feed
 Comrades of the heavenly calling
 Day by day the manna fell
 Followers of Christ of every name
 Forever will I bless the Lord
 Grant me, heavenly Lord, to feel
 The Lord is King! lift up thy voice
 Thou art the Everlasting Word
 'Tis not that I did choose Thee

References

External links

 Hymns
 The first World Anti-Slavery Convention, 1840
 Sonnets – The Seasons
 Hymns
 Oxford Dictionary of National Biography

The Modern Traveller online

 
 v.1. Palestine.	
 v.2-3. Syria and Asia. 
 v.4. Arabia	
 v.5-6. Egypt, Nubia, and Abyssinia.
 v.7-10. India. v.7, v.8, v.9, v.10
 v.11. Burmah, Siam, &c.	
 v.12-13. Persia and China. 
 v.14. Turkey.	
 v.15-16. Greece.	
 v.17. Russia.	
 v.18-19. Spain and Portugal.	
 v.20-22. Africa. v.20, 21, 22.
 v.23-24. North America.
 v.25-26. Mexico and Guatemala. 
 v.27. Columbia.	
 v.28. Peru and Chile.	
 v.29-30. Brazil and Buenos Ayres.
 v.31-33. Italy. v.1, v.2, v.3

English Congregationalists
1789 births
1855 deaths
English abolitionists
Burials at Abney Park Cemetery
English book editors
Christian hymnwriters
English hymnwriters
Congregationalist abolitionists